The Savannah River is a major river in the southeastern United States, forming most of the border between the states of South Carolina and Georgia. Two tributaries of the Savannah, the Tugaloo River and the Chattooga River, form the northernmost part of the border. The Savannah River drainage basin extends into the southeastern side of the Appalachian Mountains just inside North Carolina, bounded by the Eastern Continental Divide. The Savannah was formed by the confluence of the Tugaloo River and the Seneca River. Today this confluence is submerged beneath Lake Hartwell. The Tallulah Gorge is located on the Tallulah River, a tributary of the Tugaloo River that forms the northwest branch of the Savannah River.

Two major cities are located along the Savannah River: Savannah and Augusta, Georgia. They were nuclei of early English settlements during the Colonial period of American history.

The Savannah River is tidal at Savannah proper. Downstream from there, the river broadens into an estuary before flowing into the Atlantic Ocean. The area where the river's estuary meets the ocean is known as "Tybee Roads".  The Intracoastal Waterway flows through a section of the Savannah River near the city of Savannah.

Name
The name "Savannah" comes from a group of Shawnee who migrated to the Piedmont region in the 1680s. They destroyed the Westo and occupied established Westo lands at the Savannah River's head of navigation on the Fall Line. Present-day Augusta developed near there. These Shawnee were called by several variant names, which all derive from their native name, Ša·wano·ki (literally, "southerners"). The local variants included Shawano, Savano, Savana, and Savannah.

Another theory is that the name was derived from the English term "savanna", a kind of tropical grassland, which was borrowed by the English from Spanish sabana and used in the colonial southeast. The Spanish word was borrowed from the Taino word zabana. 

Other theories interpret the name Savannah to have come from Atlantic coastal tribes, who spoke Algonquian languages. These have similar terms meaning "southerner" and, perhaps, "salt".

History

Historical and variant names of the Savannah River, as listed by the U.S. Geological Survey, include May River, Westobou River (for the Westo tribe), Kosalu River, Isundiga River, and Girande River, among others.

The Westobou River was the former name of the Savannah River that was derived from the Westo (also known as Westoe) Native Americans. The Westo were thought to have migrated from the northeast, pushed out by the more powerful tribes of the Iroquois Confederacy, who had acquired firearms through trade. This migration, beginning in the late 16th century, resulted in the Westo Indians reaching the present area of Augusta, Georgia, in what was likely to be the 1660s.

The Westo used the river for fishing and water supplies, for transportation, and for trade. They were strong enough to hold off the Spanish colonists making incursions from Florida. The Carolina Colony needed the Westo alliance during its early years. When Carolinians desired to expand their  trade to Charleston, they viewed the Westo tribe as an obstacle. In order to remove the tribe, they sent a group called the Goose Creek Men to arm the Savanna (also known as the Savannah) Indians, a Shawnee tribe, who defeated the Westo in the Westo War of 1680.

Following this, the English colonists renamed the river as the Savannah; it was integral to early development. They founded two major cities on the river during the colonial era:  Savannah was established in 1733 as a seaport on the Atlantic Ocean, and Augusta is located where the river crosses the Fall Line of the Piedmont, at the headwaters of the navigable portion of the river downstream to the ocean. The two large cities on the Savannah served as Georgia's first two state capitals. In the nineteenth century, the sandy river channel changed frequently, causing numerous steamboat accidents.

During the American Civil War, President Abraham Lincoln proclaimed a blockade around the Confederate States of America, forcing merchantmen to use specific ports along the coast best suited for this purpose. The harbor at Savannah became one of the busiest ports for blockade runners bringing in supplies for the Confederacy until it was cut off by the reduction of Fort Pulaski and Union capture of Cockspur Island.

20th century to present
The Savannah River was significant during the 1950s when construction started on the U.S. government's Savannah River Plant, intended to produce plutonium and tritium for nuclear weapons. In 1956 Clyde L. Cowan and Frederick Reines detected neutrinos with an experiment carried out at the Savannah River Nuclear Plant, after a preliminary experiment at the Hanford Site. They placed a 10-ton tank of water next to a powerful nuclear reactor engaged in making plutonium for use in nuclear weapons. After shielding the neutrino trap underground and running it for about 100 days over the course of a year, they detected a few synchronized flashes of gamma radiation, which signaled the interaction of a few neutrinos with the protons in the water. The neutrinos were not themselves observed, and they never have been. Their presence is inferred by an exceedingly rare interaction. One out of every billion neutrinos that pass through the water tank hits a proton, producing the telltale burst of radiation. In 1995 Reines was awarded the Nobel Prize in Physics for this accomplishment, but Cowen did not live long enough to share it.

Between 1946 and 1985, the U.S. Army Corps of Engineers built three major dams on the Savannah for hydroelectricity, flood control, and navigation.

Natural history
The Savannah River flows through a variety of climates and ecosystems during its course.  It is considered an alluvial river, draining a  drainage basin and carrying large amounts of sediment to the ocean.  At its headwaters in the Blue Ridge Mountains, the climate is quite temperate.  The river's tributaries receive a small amount of snow-melt runoff in the winter.  The majority of the river's flow through the Piedmont region is dominated by large reservoirs.  Below the Fall Line, the river slows and is surrounded by large blackwater bald cypress swamps. Numerous oxbow lakes mark the locations of old river channels, which have shifted course because of earthquakes and silting.  

Another prominent feature are the numerous large bluffs that line the river in some locations. Most notable of these is Yamacraw Bluff, the location selected to build the city of Savannah.  The river becomes a large estuary at the coast, where fresh- and saltwater mix.  River dredging operations to maintain the Port of Savannah have caused the estuary zone to move further upstream than its historical home. This is causing the rare freshwater marshland to be taken over by saltwater spartina marsh.

The river supports a large variety of native and introduced aquatic species:

Upper section - yellow perch, brook trout, brown trout, rainbow trout, smallmouth bass, largemouth bass, crappie, striped bass, hybrid striped bass, white bass, bluegill, North American river otter, American mink, North American beaver, catfish
Middle section - largemouth bass, crappie, striped bass, spotted bass, bluegill, redbreast sunfish, catfish, American eel, North American river otter, American mink, North American beaver, shortnose sturgeon, chain pickerel, bowfin, longnose gar, snapping turtles, American alligator, water moccasin
Lower section, estuary - largemouth bass, crappie, striped bass, spotted bass, bluegill, redbreast sunfish, catfish, American eel, North American river otter, American mink, North American beaver, shortnose sturgeon, Atlantic sturgeon, chain pickerel, bowfin, longnose gar, snapping turtles, American alligator, snakes, red drum, flounder, spotted seatrout, bull shark, tarpon, common bottlenose dolphin, West Indian manatee, diamondback terrapin

Additionally, the river is one of only four left in the southeast with significant populations of Hymenocallis coronaria, the shoals spider-lily.  It has three populations in the primary river basin and one each in the tributaries of Stevens Creek in South Carolina and the Broad River in Georgia.

Land cover and land use history
The Savannah River basin in the Southeast region of the U.S. has been experiencing environmental change from anthropocentric activities. The conversion of the vegetation cover, including the urban growth, agriculture expansion, and deforestation and reforestation take place throughout the basin, especially near the lakes and tributary waters in the middle and lower Savannah Basin. The continuous change of land use such as the conversion of forest areas to other types of land cover and vice versa can significantly lead to increasing threats to the environmental systems of the region.

Navigation
Through the building of several locks and dams in the first half of the 20th century (such as the New Savannah Bluff Lock and Dam, completed in 1937 during the Great Depression), and upstream reservoirs like Lake Hartwell, the Savannah River was once navigable by freight barges between Augusta, Georgia (on the Fall Line) and the Atlantic Ocean. Maintenance of this channel for commercial shipping ended in 1979, and the one lock below Augusta has been deactivated.

When a large piece of equipment (a deaerator) needed to be delivered to the Vogtle Electric Generating Plant construction site in 2013, the barge travelled upstream from the Port of Savannah only to the Georgia Power's Plant McIntosh site, near Rincon, Georgia; from there, the cargo was moved by a road transporter.

Pollution
The Savannah River has the fourth-highest toxic discharge in the country, according to a 2009 report by Environment America.

Notable tributaries
Black Creek
Brier Creek
Broad River
Chattooga River
Ebenezer Creek
Knoxboro Creek
Little River
Rocky River
Seneca River
Tugaloo River

Crossings
This is a list of crossings of the Savannah River.

Dams
Hartwell Dam
Richard B. Russell Dam
J. Strom Thurmond Dam (Clarks Hill Dam)
Stevens Creek Dam
Augusta City Dam
New Savannah Bluff Lock and Dam

See also
List of Georgia rivers
List of South Carolina rivers
 South Atlantic-Gulf Water Resource Region

References
Stokes, Thomas, L, The Savannah (Rivers of America Series), Rinehart, 1951
 Url

Notes

External links

 Two Historic Savannah River Ferries historical marker
 

 
Rivers of Georgia (U.S. state)
Rivers of South Carolina
Borders of South Carolina
Borders of Georgia (U.S. state)